Gutchess Metropolitan Business College was a business college in Detroit that began in 1896 and was still operating in 1920.

References

Education in Detroit